Muyu Muyu (Quechua muyu circle, the reduplication indicates that there is a group or a complex of something, "a complex of circles", also spelled Muyo Muyo) is an archaeological complex in Peru. It is located in the Apurímac Region, Chincheros Province, Uranmarca District.

References 

Archaeological sites in Peru
Archaeological sites in Apurímac Region